Gobinda Bahadur Shah is a Nepalese politician. He was elected to the Pratinidhi Sabha in the 1999 election on behalf of the Nepali Congress. Shah was the NC candidate in the Achham-1 constituency for the 2008 Constituent Assembly election.

References

Living people
Nepali Congress politicians from Sudurpashchim Province
Year of birth missing (living people)
Nepal MPs 1999–2002